Colshill is a surname. Notable people with the surname include:

 Robert Colshill, MP for Steyning (UK Parliament constituency)
 Thomas Colshill ( 1518–1595), English politician, member of the Parliament of England